Oliver Schmidt may refer to:

Oliver Schmidt (footballer)
Oliver Schmidt (engineer)